Ciaran Eugene Gultnieks (born 1970) is a British computer game programmer, whose projects include Star Wars (1988, for home computers), Dogfight (1993), Slipstream 5000 (1995) and Hardwar (1998) for the PC. He is the founder of F-Droid and contributes to the microblogging platform GNU social.

Biography
Gultnieks was the first employee at Vektor Grafix, later moving on to work for Microprose and Spectrum Holobyte. In 1993, he co-founded development house The Software Refinery, which closed in 2002. In recent years he has contributed to various open source software projects. In 2010, he founded the F-Droid software repository, a catalogue of FOSS applications for the Android platform.

Works
He is credited on the following games:

Star Wars (1987), Domark
Star Wars: The Empire Strikes Back (1988), Domark
Fighter Bomber (1989), Activision
Strike Aces (1990), Activision
Killing Cloud, The (1991) Image Works
Dogfight (1993), Microprose
Air Duel: 80 Years of Dogfighting (1993), MicroProse
Slipstream 5000 (1995), Gremlin Interactive
Hardwar (1998), Gremlin Interactive

References

External links
Personal home page

British computer programmers
Video game programmers
Living people
1970 births
Date of birth missing (living people)
Place of birth missing (living people)